Richard Demén-Willaume (born 28 January 1986) is a Swedish former professional ice hockey player. He is a defenceman who last played for Timrå IK in the Swedish Hockey League (SHL).

Playing career
Demén-Willaume began his junior hockey career with Frölunda HC in the J18 Allsvenskan in 2001. By the 2003–04 season Demén-Willaume played regularly in the J20 SuperElit and was selected to the Swedish World U18 Championship team in 2004. Richard was then selected by the Colorado Avalanche 154th overall in the 2004 NHL Entry Draft.

In the 2004–05 season, Demén-Willaume posted the best plus/minus (+39) in the J20 SuperElit. He also made his professional debut with Frölunda HC in the Elitserien, playing in 9 regular season games and one playoff game. After securing a regular roster spot with Frölunda in the 2005–06 season, Richard then left for North America attending the Colorado Avalanche training camp for the 2006–07 season.

Demén-Willaume was hit by injury and was assigned to semi-pro league affiliate, the Arizona Sundogs of the CHL. Appearing in only 9 games with the Sundogs, Richard then returned to Sweden. In the 2007–08 season, Demén-Willaume played in the HockeyAllsvenskan after he signed with Rögle BK. Richard helped promote the team to the Elitserien for the first time in 12 years for the 2008–09 season.

In the 2009–10 season, his third with Rögle, Richard played in only 12 games before he was released and signed for the rest of the year by Hockey Allsvenskan side, the Malmö Redhawks on January 28, 2010. After playing 13 games with the Redhawks to end the season, Richards option of an additional year did not come to fruition and he signed a one-year contract with fellow Allsvenskan side Borås HC on July 9, 2010.

Demén-Willaume played 43 games with Boras in the following season, which included an early loan to return to Frölunda before he was returned to the Allsvenskan after only 6 games. Unable to deliver on his potential within the Swedish leagues, Demén-Willaume then signed a one-year contract at season's end with Dragons de Rouen of the French Ligue Magnus on May 9, 2011.

A free agent to begin the 2012–13 season, Demén-Willaume joined Finnish club SaiPa on a try-out contract on September 17, 2012. After 14 games in the SM-liiga, he was released from his try-out and returned to Sweden, signing with HockeyAllsvenskan club, Tingsryds AIF, on November 12, 2012.

Demén-Willaume stay with Tingsryds was cut short after only two games as he was signed on an initial try-out with Elitserien club, Timrå IK, before earning a contract for the remainder of the season on December 12, 2012.

Career statistics

Regular season and playoffs

International

References

External links

1986 births
Living people
Swedish ice hockey defencemen
Arizona Sundogs players
Borås HC players
Colorado Avalanche draft picks
Frölunda HC players
Malmö Redhawks players
Rögle BK players
Rouen HE 76 players
SaiPa players
Timrå IK players
Tingsryds AIF players